The 2017 ATP Lyon Open (also known as the Open Parc Auvergne-Rhône-Alpes Lyon) was a men's tennis tournament that was played on outdoor clay courts. It was the 1st edition of the Lyon Open and part of the ATP World Tour 250 series of the 2017 ATP World Tour. It took place in the city of Lyon, France, from May 21 through May 27, 2017.

Jo-Wilfried Tsonga won the title, defeating Tomáš Berdych in the final, 7–6(7–2), 7–5.

Seeds
The top four seeds receive a bye into the second round.

Draw

Finals

Top half

Bottom half

Qualifying

Seeds

Qualifiers

Lucky losers

Qualifying draw

First qualifier

Second qualifier

Third qualifier

Fourth qualifier

External links
 Main Draw
 Qualifying Draw

2017 Singles
2017 ATP World Tour
2017 in French tennis